The 2021 British & Irish Lions tour to South Africa was an international rugby union tour that took place in South Africa in July and August 2021. The British & Irish Lions, a team selected from players eligible to represent England, Ireland, Scotland or Wales, played a three-match test series against South Africa, and tour matches against three of South Africa's four United Rugby Championship teams and South Africa A.

The COVID-19 pandemic significantly disrupted the tour, leading to numerous schedule changes and the matches in South Africa taking place without fans present. Before leaving for South Africa, the Lions beat Japan in a warm-up match at Murrayfield Stadium in Edinburgh. They won all of their matches against the South African franchises, but lost to South Africa A.

South Africa won the test series by two matches to one. The Lions won the first test 22–17 on 24 July, but South Africa won the second test 27–9 a week later before winning the third test 19–16 with a late penalty on 7 August.

Warren Gatland was the Lions' head coach, making him only the second coach to lead the team on three consecutive tours. Alun Wyn Jones of Wales was the Lions' tour captain, but was injured in the home match against Japan on 26 June; he initially withdrew from the squad before returning three weeks later. Ireland's Conor Murray took over as captain during Jones' absence.

Schedule
The eight-match schedule was announced on 4 December 2019, and confirmed on 14 May 2021. The Lions also scheduled a home match against Japan for 26 June, the first time the teams had met, and the first game to be hosted by the Lions since they played Argentina at the Millennium Stadium in 2005. Unlike recent tours, when the Lions played seven games against non-national teams, in 2021 there are only five.

Due to the uncertainty of the COVID-19 pandemic, it was reported in early 2021 that the tour could be held in Britain and Ireland instead of South Africa, postponed to 2022 or cancelled altogether. With the Lions traditionally being a touring side, thousands of fans signed a petition to put pressure on the Lions board to keep the tour in South Africa and postpone until 2022. In January 2021, Rugby Australia offered to host the tournament in Australia if it could not be held in South Africa, but this was rejected. In March 2021, it was confirmed that the tour would go ahead as planned.

Originally, the eight matches were to be played in the home stadiums of the Lions' opponents. Due to COVID, the schedule was changed so that all eight matches would be played in only four venues, all in Gauteng or Cape Town, to reduce the teams' travel requirements. A match against an SA Invitational team was replaced by one against the South African Lions franchise to reduce the risks associated with drawing a squad from around the country. The match against the Bulls was cancelled due to several positive COVID tests in the Bulls' camp, and a second match against the Sharks was added instead. On 20 July, it was announced that the second and third tests would be moved from Johannesburg to Cape Town.

Squads

Lions
Lions chairman Jason Leonard announced an initial squad of 37 on 6 May 2021, made up of 11 players from England, 10 from Wales, 8 from Ireland and 8 from Scotland.

Prop Andrew Porter withdrew from the squad on 5 June because of a toe injury; he was replaced by Kyle Sinckler.

Rónan Kelleher joined the pre-tour training camp in Jersey to cover for hookers Jamie George and Luke Cowan-Dickie, who had club commitments. Kelleher was not added to the touring squad at the time, but was called up to the squad on 14 July.

On 26 June, tour captain Alun Wyn Jones and Justin Tipuric withdrew from the tour after being injured against Japan; Adam Beard and Josh Navidi were called up as their replacements. On 14 July, Jones returned to the squad, having overcome his shoulder injury.

On 10 July, Marcus Smith was called up as Finn Russell was injured, with Russell remaining on the tour.

Notes: Ages listed are as of the first tour match on 26 June. Player positions are per the Lions' website. Bold denotes that the player was selected for a previous Lions squad. Italic denotes a player that withdrew from the squad following selection.

Management and staff
Reported candidates to coach the 2021 Lions included Warren Gatland, Eddie Jones, Gregor Townsend, Joe Schmidt, Dai Young and Mark McCall. Gatland was announced as the head coach on 12 June 2019.

On 13 April 2021, Gatland announced his coaching team, including Scotland head coach Gregor Townsend as attack coach, Scotland defence coach Steve Tandy, Leinster forwards coach Robin McBryde and Wales kicking coach Neil Jenkins. This was the sixth tour for Jenkins (two as a player, four as a coach), for Townsend, Tandy and McBryde this is their first Lions tour as coaches.

South Africa
On 5 June, South Africa named a 46-man squad for their two-test series against Georgia and the three tests against the British & Irish Lions.

On 10 July, Lizo Gqoboka and Fez Mbatha were added to the squad as COVID-19 cover.

Coaching team:
Head coach:  Jacques Nienaber
Forwards coach:  Deon Davids
Backs coach:  Mzwandile Stick
Assistant coach:  Felix Jones
Assistant coach:  Daan Human

Note: Ages, caps and clubs as of first test match on 24 July 2021.

Matches

British & Irish Lions v Japan
The Lions began their 2021 tour with their first ever match in Scotland. Lions captain Alun Wyn Jones was substituted in the 7th minute after suffering a dislocated shoulder that seemed to rule him out of the tour. The Lions went 21–0 up in the first 23 minutes, through tries from Josh Adams, Duhan van der Merwe and Robbie Henshaw, all converted by Dan Biggar, but also lost flanker Justin Tipuric to a shoulder injury in the 21st minute. Tadhg Beirne added a fourth try after half-time, again converted by Biggar to make it 28–0. Japan responded with a try by Kazuki Himeno after 58 minutes, converted by Yu Tamura, who also kicked a penalty with 12 minutes to go to make the final score 28–10.

Lions v British & Irish Lions

Sharks v British & Irish Lions

Sharks v British & Irish Lions

South Africa A v British & Irish Lions

Stormers v British & Irish Lions

South Africa v British & Irish Lions (first test)

Notes:
Wyn Jones (British & Irish Lions) was originally named in the starting XV, but withdrew ahead of the game due to injury. He was replaced by Rory Sutherland, who was replaced by Mako Vunipola on the bench.
Tadhg Beirne, Dan Biggar, Tom Curry, Jack Conan, Luke Cowan-Dickie, Robbie Henshaw, Stuart Hogg, Ali Price, Rory Sutherland, Duhan van der Merwe and Hamish Watson all made their Lions test debuts.
Handré Pollard (South Africa) earned his 50th test cap.
With Stuart Hogg, Duhan van der Merwe, Ali Price and Rory Sutherland in the starting line-up, this match represented the first time since 2005 that any Scottish player started a British & Irish Lions test match, and the most Scottish players named in starting line-up since 1989.

South Africa v British & Irish Lions (second test)

Notes:
Steven Kitshoff (South Africa) earned his 50th test cap.
Chris Harris made his Lions test debut.

South Africa v British & Irish Lions (third test)

Notes:
Damian de Allende (South Africa) earned his 50th test cap.
Josh Adams, Bundee Aki, Adam Beard, Wyn Jones, Finn Russell and Sam Simmonds all made their Lions test debuts.

Notes

References

British and Irish Lions
British & Irish Lions tours of South Africa
British And Irish Lions
Lions
Lions